Ingebrigt S. Sørfonn (born 27 May 1950 in Fitjar) is a Norwegian politician representing the Christian People's Party. He is currently a representative of Hordaland in the Storting and was first elected in 1997. Sørfonn was the Mayor of Fitjar from 1979 to 1981 and again from 1986 to 1987.

Sørfonn is the current leader of the lobby group Israels Venner på Stortinget.

Storting committees
2005–2009 member of the Business committee.
2001–2005 second deputy leader of the Finance committee.
2001–2005 member of the Extended Foreign Affairs committee.
2005–2009 member of the Finance committee.

References

1950 births
Living people
Christian Democratic Party (Norway) politicians
Members of the Storting
Norwegian Christians
21st-century Norwegian politicians
20th-century Norwegian politicians